Shanklin Glacier is a glacier in the Hughes Range of Antarctica, flowing southeast from Mount Waterman to enter Muck Glacier at a point  west of Ramsey Glacier.

The glacier was named by Advisory Committee on Antarctic Names (US-ACAN) for CWO David M. Shanklin of the U.S. Army Aviation Detachment which supported the Texas Tech Shackleton Glacier Expedition, 1964–65.

References

Glaciers of Dufek Coast